Muzaffarabad (IPA: [mʊzəffərɑːbɑːd]) is the capital and largest city of Azad Kashmir, and the 60th largest in Pakistan.

The city is located in Muzaffarabad District, near the confluence of the Jhelum and Neelum rivers. The district is bounded by the Pakistani province of Khyber Pakhtunkhwa in the west, the Kupwara and Baramulla districts of Indian-administered Jammu and Kashmir in the east, and the Neelum District in the north.

History
Muzaffarabad was founded in 1646 by Sultan Muzaffar Khan, chief of the Bomba tribe who ruled Kashmir. Khan also constructed the Red Fort that same year for the purpose of warding off incursions from the Mughal Empire.

2005 earthquake 

The city was near the epicenter of the 2005 Kashmir earthquake, which had a magnitude of 7.6 Mw. The earthquake destroyed about 50% of the buildings in the city (including most government buildings) and is estimated to have killed up to 80,000 people in the Pakistani-controlled areas. , the Pakistani government's official death toll was 87,350, while other estimates have put the death toll at over 100,000.

Administrative subdivisions 

The district of Muzaffarabad is administratively divided into 2 tehsils, which are subdivided into 25 union councils.

 Muzaffarabad
 Pattika (Naseerabad)

Climate

Transport 

The nearest railway station is located in the Rawalpindi District of Pakistani Punjab.

Notable people
 Anam Najam, medical doctor and psychiatrist

Gallery

See also
 Awan Patti

Notes

References

External links
 Government official Website

 
Capitals of Pakistan
Tehsils of Muzaffarabad District
Hill stations in Pakistan
Kabul Shahi
Kashmir
2005 Kashmir earthquake
Populated places established in 1646